Martin Mooney (born 25 September 1970 in Alexandria) is a Scottish former footballer who is currently assistant head coach to Gordon Wylde at East of Scotland League side Camelon Juniors FC|title=Sludden Is New Shire Boss |publisher=East Stirlingshire FC |date=25 May 2016 |accessdate=25 May 2016 |url-status=dead |archiveurl=https://web.archive.org/web/20160617174847/https://eaststirlingshirefc.co.uk/newsp.php?modnews=1854 |archivedate=17 June 2016 }}</ref>

During his career, Mooney played for Falkirk, Stirling Albion (on loan), Dumbarton and Stenhousemuir. He was assistant manager at Berwick Rangers to Allan McGonigal before both departed the club in November 2008. Mooney was also assistant manager to Stevie Kerrigan at Camelon Juniors. In 2011 Martin became assistant manager at Kilsyth Rangers, winning the Central District First Division. In May 2016, Mooney was appointed assistant manager to John Sludden at East Stirlingshire, following their relegation to the Lowland League.He was named Manager of Sauchie FC June 2019 but had to leave due to family reasons September 2019. He is now a coach at Denny amateur FC

References

External links
 
 
 
 

1970 births
Living people
Scottish footballers
Association football forwards
Falkirk F.C. players
Stirling Albion F.C. players
Dumbarton F.C. players
Stenhousemuir F.C. players
Scottish Football League players